Placonotus is a genus of beetles in the family Laemophloeidae. There are 40 currently recognized species, known from all continents except Antarctica. Placonotus species are small (~2mm), elongate, flattened beetles, characterized by long filiform antennae, presence of a frontoclypeal suture, open anterior coxal cavities, and broadly rounded intercoxal process of abdominal ventrite III. Males have the 8th abdominal segment modified to form claspers used during mating. Adults and larvae are found under dead bark, where they feed on fungi. Currently recognized species are:

 Placonotus africanus Lefkovitch
 Placonotus arizonensis Thomas
 Placonotus bolivari Grouvelle
 Placonotus debanus Mukhopadhyay
 Placonotus decoratus Grouvelle
 Placonotus dolce Lefkovitch
 Placonotus donacioides Wollaston
 Placonotus ealaensis Lefkovitch
 Placonotus embuensis Thomas
 Placonotus exornatus Grouvelle
 Placonotus falinorum Thomas
 Placonotus gladiator Thomas
 Placonotus granulatus Wollaston
 Placonotus himalaicus Mukhopadhyay & Sen Gupta
 Placonotus infimus Sharp
 Placonotus keralicus Mukhopadhyay & Sen Gupta
 Placonotus macrognathus Thomas
 Placonotus majus Lefkovitch
 Placonotus maya Thomas
 Placonotus mestus Lefkovitch
 Placonotus modestus Say
 Placonotus mossus Lefkovitch
 Placonotus nitens LeConte
 Placonotus orientalis Grouvelle
 Placonotus pallentipennis Reitter
 Placonotus patruelis Thomas
 Placonotus planifrons Thomas
 Placonotus politissimus Wollaston
 Placonotus proximus Grouvelle
 Placonotus pseudomodestus Thomas
 Placonotus pseudoproximus Mukhopadhyay & Sen Gupta
 Placonotus rigidus Olliff
 Placonotus saudicus Slipinski
 Placonotus subgranulatus Grouvelle
 Placonotus subtestaceus Grouvelle
 Placonotus subtruncatus Lefkovitch
 Placonotus tastus Lefkovitch
 Placonotus testaceus Fabricius
 Placonotus torsus Mukhopadhyay & Sen Gupta
 Placonotus zimmermanni LeConte

The genus has been treated taxonomically for several geographical regions: the New World; Africa; Europe; and India. The Asian, Pacific, and Australian faunas have not been worked and there are probably many unassigned and undescribed species.

References

Laemophloeidae